Zhinzifovo is a village in Kardzhali Municipality, Kardzhali Province, in southern Bulgaria.

References

Villages in Kardzhali Province